is a village in Gmina Istebna, Cieszyn County in Silesian Voivodeship, southern Poland. The village is situated in Beskid Śląski mountain range, near to the borders with the Czech Republic and Slovakia, in the historical region of Cieszyn Silesia.

The name is of topographic origins and is derived from sycamore trees (Polish: jawor) and is a diminutive form of jaworzyna.

History 
The village was first mentioned in 1621 as Jaworzinka. It belonged then to the Duchy of Teschen, a fee of Kingdom of Bohemia and a part of the Habsburg monarchy.

After Revolutions of 1848 in the Austrian Empire a modern municipal division was introduced in the re-established Austrian Silesia. The village as a municipality was subscribed to the political district of Cieszyn and the legal district of Jablunkov. According to the censuses conducted in 1880, 1890, 1900 and 1910 the population of the municipality grew from 1,369 in 1880 to 1,642 in 1910 with the majority being native Polish-speakers (between 99.4% and 99.9%) accompanied by German-speaking (at most 8 or 0.6% in 1890) and Czech-speaking people (at most 6 or 0.4% in 1910). In terms of religion in 1910 the majority were Roman Catholics (98.9%), followed by Protestants (19 or 1.1%). The village was also traditionally inhabited by Silesian Gorals, speaking Jablunkov dialect.

After World War I, fall of Austria-Hungary, Polish–Czechoslovak War and the division of Cieszyn Silesia in 1920, it became a part of Poland and was transferred to Cieszyn County. In 1924 part of the village was separated from Jaworzynka and formed a new village, Hrčava, transferred to Czechoslovakia. Jaworzynka was then annexed by Nazi Germany at the beginning of World War II. After the war it was restored to Poland.

Emigration
Many families from the Jaworzyka and Istebna area emigrated to Sheridan, Wyoming to work in underground coal mines along the Tongue River.

Notable people
 Mateusz Haratyk, cross-country skier

References 

Villages in Cieszyn County
Cieszyn Silesia